Alexander "Sasha" Argov (born Alexander Abramovich; Moscow, 26 October 1914 – Tel Aviv, 27 September 1995) was a prominent Israeli composer.

Life and career

Argov was born Alexander Abramovich in Moscow, Russia in 1914; later changing his last name to its Hebrew version, Argov, in 1946. His father was a dentist and his mother a concert pianist. He began studying the piano with his mother at the age of three, and at the age of six he began to compose music by ear which his mother transcribed into music notation for him. He had no formal education in music outside of his lessons with his mother.

He migrated to British Palestine from Russia in 1934 with his parents. He never made a living with his music, working first as a bank clerk and later owning and operating a bookshop.

Argov composed many popular songs, producing approximately 1,200 works. Among them were "Hareut" and songs for the Israel Defense Forces, film, and theater. In 1948 he published Ha’Chizbatron, a collection of his songs written for the entertainment of Israeli troupes. He collaborated with Chaim Hefer and Matti Caspi, two of whose albums feature melodies written exclusively by Argov. He also composed several film scores and musicals for the stage; of which the most successful was Shlomo hamelech ve’Shalmai hansandlar (‘King Solomon and the Cobbler’) which premiered in 1964. In 1988, he was awarded the Israel Prize in Hebrew song.

Dramatic works
Rak lo be’Shabat (film score, 1964)
Shlomo hamelech ve’Shalmai hasandlar (musical, 1964)
Harpatka bakirkas (children’s play with music, 1965)
Androceles ve’ha’arie (children’s play with music, 1966)
Ester hamalka (musical, 1966)
Hu halach basadot (film score, 1967)
Chagigat kaiz (musical, 1972)
Doda Klara (film score, 1977)

See also
List of Israel Prize recipients

References

1914 births
1995 deaths
Composers in the Palestine mandate
Israeli composers
Israel Prize in Hebrew song recipients
Soviet emigrants to Mandatory Palestine
Burials at Yarkon Cemetery

Musicians from Moscow
20th-century composers
Chizbatron members
Israeli male songwriters